Odd Frantzen (20 January 1913 – 2 October 1977) was a Norwegian football outside right player from Bergen who played for SK Hardy. He was capped 20 times for Norway, and scored five international goals. He was a member of Norway's 1936 Summer Olympics bronze medal team, beating Germany 2-0 in the quarter finals, and played in the 1938 World Cup. Norway their first match to Italy in the round 16 (2-1), and Italy would go on to win the cup.

Frantzen was kicked to death by an intruder to his home on 2 October 1977. A 25-year-old man was convicted of manslaughter for the incident, with a 24-year old female accomplice (they received 5 and 1 years prison time, respectively). The goal of the intrusion was to acquire alcohol.

Frantzen married Betty Blindheim on 26 July 1941; they separated in 1965. Frantzen had at least two granddaughters , Joy Frantzen and Linn Therese Solend Otterbu .

References

External links
profile

1913 births
1977 deaths
Norwegian footballers
Footballers at the 1936 Summer Olympics
Olympic footballers of Norway
Olympic bronze medalists for Norway
Norway international footballers
1938 FIFA World Cup players
Olympic medalists in football
Male murder victims
Norwegian manslaughter victims
Medalists at the 1936 Summer Olympics
Association football forwards
Footballers from Bergen